Louis Knox Barlow (born July 17, 1966) is an American alternative rock musician and songwriter. A founding member of the groups Dinosaur Jr., Sebadoh and The Folk Implosion, Barlow is credited with helping to pioneer the lo-fi style of rock music in the late 1980s and early 1990s. His first band, which was formed in Amherst, Massachusetts, was Deep Wound. Barlow was born in Dayton, Ohio, and raised in Jackson, Michigan, and Westfield, Massachusetts.

Barlow has released four solo albums, the latest of which is the May 28, 2021 release Reason to Live.

Dinosaur Jr.

Barlow attended high school in Westfield, Massachusetts, where he met Scott Helland. The two formed the Massachusetts-based hardcore punk band Deep Wound. J Mascis joined the band after answering their ad for a "drummer wanted to play really fast". After becoming disillusioned with the constraints of hardcore, Deep Wound broke up in 1984. Mascis and Barlow reunited that year to form Dinosaur, later Dinosaur Jr. Mascis and Barlow had personality conflicts throughout Dinosaur Jr.'s early existence, and after the 1988 release of their third album, Bug, and the initial supporting tour, Barlow was kicked out of the band.

In 2005, Barlow rejoined the band alongside the original drummer, Murph. Since then, the band has reissued its first three records, toured extensively worldwide and released five new records, Beyond, Farm, I Bet on Sky, Give a Glimpse of What Yer Not, and Sweep It Into Space .

Sebadoh, Sentridoh and the Folk Implosion

After his dismissal from Dinosaur Jr., Barlow turned his attention to his band Sebadoh, which he had formed earlier with multi-instrumentalist Eric Gaffney. The project featured low fidelity recording techniques and combined Barlow's introspective, confessional songwriting with Gaffney's discordant noise collages. Bassist and songwriter Jason Loewenstein was added to the line-up in 1989. Sebadoh's early releases include The Freed Man (1989) and Weed Forestin' (1990), the latter of which was originally self-released under the name Sentridoh in 1987. Both albums were officially released by Homestead Records, as was the band's third album, Sebadoh III (1991), which helped establish the "lo-fi" subgenre and became a defining album of 90s indie rock. The band released several studio-recorded albums on Sub Pop Records throughout the 1990s.

As Sebadoh grew in popularity and critical acclaim, Barlow continued work on the Sentridoh side project, which featured mostly home-recorded material similar to his output on the first three Sebadoh albums, but often recorded solo and with a less consistent sound quality. Sentridoh released a trio of cassette-only albums on Shrimper Records in the early 1990s, with the highlights later being collected on CD and vinyl compilations like Winning Losers: A Collection of Home Recordings 89–93 (1994) and Another Collection of Home Recordings (1994). In 1993, Sentridoh released a popular single for the song "Losercore," on the label Smells Like Records founded by Steve Shelley of the American rock band, Sonic Youth. Barlow has called it "the most finely executed of all my releases" thanks to Shelley, who "made sure this looked and sounded great." Numerous other Sentridoh releases on a variety of record labels followed, including releases on his own Loobiecore label.

In 1994, Barlow formed the Folk Implosion with singer-songwriter John Davis. The band released several singles and EPs, and in 1995 reached the Top 40 with the song "Natural One", from the soundtrack to the film Kids by Larry Clark. It remains Barlow's biggest commercial hit.

After the release of Sebadoh's eighth album, The Sebadoh, in 1999, the band went on hiatus and its members went on to pursue other projects. Barlow continued to work with the Folk Implosion, releasing One Part Lullaby in 1999. Barlow took a break from the Folk Implosion in 2000 to collaborate on the album Subsonic 6 with Belgian musician, Rudy Trouvé. In 2003, Barlow released The New Folk Implosion featuring Imaad Wasif on guitar and Sebadoh drummer Russ Pollard on drums. The same year, he appeared as a musician in the film Laurel Canyon.  In the spring of 2004, Barlow briefly reunited with Loewenstein for the "Turbo Acoustic" Sebadoh tour. During this tour, he also reunited with J Mascis for a performance of the song "Video Prick" with former Deep Wound vocalist Charlie Nakajima.  This performance led to a full-fledged Dinosaur Jr. reunion in 2005, with original members Barlow, Mascis and Murph performing "The Lung" on The Late Late Show with Craig Ferguson on April 15, 2005, and a show at Spaceland in Los Angeles the following night.  The band then played well-received tours of the U.S. and Europe throughout the rest of the year, and in 2006 headed to Japan, Australia and New Zealand. In 2007, Barlow reunited with Loewenstein and Gaffney to perform the first Sebadoh shows with the "classic" lineup in 14 years. In June 2013, Sebadoh released their first new music in 14 years; the music was released as an EP precursor to their new album, "Defend Yourself," which was released in September 2013. Both of the new EP and LP albums were released through Joyful Noise Recordings.

Other collaborations
 Released the instrumental split album Subsonic 6 (2000) with Belgian musician, Rudy Trouvé
 Sings on the track "Some" by Sharon Stoned, on the album License to Confuse (1995)
 Sings on the tracks "My Brother Moves" and "Everything You Know Is Wrong" by Production Club, from the album Follow Your Bliss (2003)
 Sings on the track "In the City in the Rain" by the 6ths on Wasps' Nests 6 6/6"
 Plays bass on the track "Strange Song" by Supreme Dicks, on the album The Unexamined Life (1993)

Solo work
Barlow released the first album under his own name, Emoh, in January 2005 on Merge Records. It featured long-time collaborators such as Sebadoh members Jason Loewenstein and Russ Pollard and Lou's sister Abby Barlow, and featured a higher production value than many of his previous solo releases. Jason Crock of Pitchfork called it "the most consistently strong record he's released since The Folk Implosion's One Part Lullaby" and wrote that "even if much of it was recorded at home, Emoh'''s 14 unassuming folk songs sound like they were created in a professional setting." In November 2005, Barlow toured the Iberian Peninsula to promote the album.

Barlow released his second solo album, Goodnight Unknown, in October 2009 on Merge. It was produced by Andrew Murdock and featured numerous guest musicians, including Imaad Wasif on guitar and Dale Crover of the Melvins and Murph on drums.  Barlow toured the album in the U.S. in the fall of 2009, opening for Dinosaur Jr. and backed by The Missingmen of Mike Watt + the Missingmen.

Barlow's third solo album, Brace the Wave, was released on September 4, 2015 on Joyful Noise Recordings. It was recorded in six days with Justin Pizzoferrato, who also worked as a sound engineer for Dinosaur Jr. at Sonelab Studios in Massachusetts. The tracks from Brace the Wave feature Barlow's ukulele playing. Barlow also took 100 original Polaroid selfies to accompany the VIP vinyl edition of the album.

On October 28, 2016, Barlow released a 5 track EP entitled Apocalypse Fetish on Joyful Noise Recordings

In April 2021, it was announced that a solo album entitled Reason to Live would be released on May 28 via Joyful Noise.

 Personal life 
Barlow's first marriage was to Kathleen Billus, with whom he has two children, Hendrix and Hannelore.

In May 2015, he married knitwear designer Adelle Louise Burda, with whom he has a daughter, Izetta.

 Radio and podcast appearances 
Barlow appeared on WTF with Marc Maron on episode 448 released December 2, 2013.

Barlow appeared on comedian Ken Reid's TV Guidance Counselor podcast on September 18, 2015.

He has also appeared on episode 71 of the Duncan Trussell Family Hour podcast on June 24, 2013.

At the tail end of 2022 he started a podcast with his wife Adelle called RAW Impressions in which he free form talks about various topics, and plays music.

Discography

Albums

 Singles 

 EPs 

Live

Compilation

Featured in compilations

with Dinosaur JrDinosaur (1985)You're Living All Over Me (1987)Bug (1988)Beyond (2007)Farm (2009)I Bet on Sky (2012)Give a Glimpse of What Yer Not (2016)Sweep It Into Space (2021)

Tribute
(2012) Just Gimme Lou Barlow'' (A Paperheart Tribute to)

References

External links
 Lou Barlow's website
 
 Official Sebadoh website
 Lou Barlow interview at Prefixmag
 Interview with Lou Barlow (via Talk Rock To Me) August 17, 2012

1966 births
American indie rock musicians
Living people
Guitarists from Massachusetts
Musicians from Dayton, Ohio
Mint Records artists
American rock bass guitarists
American male bass guitarists
Dinosaur Jr. members
Sebadoh members
The Folk Implosion members
Guitarists from Ohio
20th-century American guitarists
Joyful Noise Recordings artists
21st-century American guitarists
Noise Addict members
Merge Records artists
Shrimper Records artists
Sub Pop artists
City Slang artists
Domino Recording Company artists